Hydrophis is a genus of sea snakes, venomous snakes in the subfamily Hydrophiinae of the family Elapidae. Species in the genus Hydrophis are typically found in Indo-Australian and Southeast Asian waters. Currently, around 36 species are recognized as being valid.

Systematics and classification
There are more than 30 recognized species in the genus.

*) Not including the nominate subspecies (typical form).

Nota bene: A binomial authority in parentheses indicates that the species was originally described in a genus other than Hydrophis.

See also
 Sea snake
 Snakebite

References

Further reading

External links
 

 
Taxa named by Pierre André Latreille
Snake genera